Chupke Chupke (Secretly) is a 2021 Pakistani romantic comedy television series directed by Danish Nawaz, written by Saima Akram Chaudhry and produced by Momina Duraid under their production banner MD Productions, which aired during Ramadan, in April and May 2021 and broadcast on Hum TV. The series is about the Nawab-Family, after the death of Nawab his two wives Naik Bakht and Naik Parwar fight with each other at every occasion they can get.

It features Ayeza Khan and Osman Khalid Butt as Meenu and Faazi in the leading roles, Aymen Saleem as Mishi, Arslan Naseer as Hadi, Uzma Beg as Naik Bakht (Bakhto), Asma Abbas as Naik Parwar, Mira Sethi as Gul-e-Rana and Ali Safina as Miskeen in the supporting cast meanwhile Tara Mahmood, Mani, Aadi Khan, Areesha Sultan, Hira Soomro and Qavi Khan in the recurring cast.

The series received acclaim due its comic storyline, on-screen chemistry of the lead couples and the performances, especially of Butt, Khan, Abbas and Beg. It was the 3rd most searched item on Google in Pakistan for 2021.

Plot 

The drama is about the Nawab Family. Nawab Sahab had two wives - Naik Parwar and Naik Bakht. Nawab Sahab treated them both equally and they live in adjacent houses, one called the "Nawab House" where Naik Bakht lives and the other one was "Nawab Villa" where Naik Parwar lives. The two wives have never-ending conflicts between them because Nawab Sahab married Naik Bakht only after two months of his wedding with Naik Parwar. Both Naik Parwar and Naik Bakht have two kids each, Naik Parwar has two sons: Kamil and Kifayat. The elder son Kamil died leaving a wife Kishwar and two sons: Hadi and Waleed. The younger son Kifayat has a poultry farm business and is married to Kaneez . They have two daughters: Muniha (Meenu) and Muniba (Mirchi). Naik Bakht has one son and one daughter. Her daughter lives in Toronto with her family. Her son Ibrahim and his wife has died while at Hajj (Muslim pilgrim) leaving three daughters and a son. The elder daughter Gul-e-Rana (Gul) and son Faaz (Faazi) are twins but Gul is a minute elder. The younger sister is Rameen(Roomi) and the youngest is Rameesha(Mishi). Gul is married to Miskeen who lives in his in-laws' house. These two don't have kids even after being married for 5 years. While Roomi is married to Arman (Mani). Mishi is unmarried and has a crush on Hadi. The three sisters and Faazi's grandmother are all searching for a suitable wife for Faazi but keep failing because Faazi wants to marry an educated and mature girl.

Hadi is unemployed and his mother and grandmother too tries to find a suitable alliance for him.

On the other hand, Meenu is a carefree and clumsy girl who is always getting into trouble with Faazi who has been asked to tutor her by Kifayat. All Meenu wants is to be rid of her studies and her tutor Faazi.

It so happens that Kishwar manages to find a match for Hadi who lives in Canada. The girl's father owns a restaurant in Canada and hopes that Hadi will come and take over the business after marrying his daughter. But the girl had other plans. A day before their wedding, she calls Hadi to tell him that she has already married someone in court. The wedding is called off to the joy of Mishi. Mishi starts throwing hints at Hadi who is initially reluctant to accept his developing feelings for her because of his friendship with Faaz and the clash between Amma and Baibay.

Meanwhile a family comes to see Faazi for their daughter Hania who is just the girl Faazi would have wanted for a wife. Hania also has a brother Asher. Hania's parents also want to marry Asher off along with Hania. Amma and Gul think that the situation is perfect and they can get Mishi married in the same family as Faazi. But due to a confusion, Hania's parents happen to see Meenu and select Meenu as their daughter in law.

They think that Meenu would be the perfect match for their son. They take an alliance to Meenu's family and after some discussion they agree. It is decided that both Meenu and Faazi would be wedded on the same day. Mishi's proposal is fixed with Hania's cousin. Hadi realizes that he has fallen for Mishi but it's too late as Mishi was soon going to be engaged.

On the wedding day, it is revealed that Asher is in fact a married man and has three daughters too. He was only looking for a second wife in order to have a son. Meenu's family is devastated and call off the wedding. Even Faazi's wedding to Hania is called off. Mishi's engagement is also broken. In order to keep the reputation of the Nawab Family intact, both families decide to get Faazi and Meenu married. Gradually Faazi and Meenu start developing feelings for each other but they face opposition from Gul, Amma and Baibay because of their never ending clash. But then arrives Bade Abba ( elder brother of Nawab Sahab ) of whom both the families respect and fear. After watching the fight between Baibay and Amma and realizing that their fights will ruin the relationship of Faazi and Meenu, he sends off Meenu to Nawab House (rukhsati) without any celebration or notice. This doesn't go well with Gul and she starts to create problems between the two with the help of Roami. On the other hand, Hadi and Mishi have fallen in love and their relationship is known to Meenu. Bade Abba wants Hadi to marry his grand daughter and everyone in the family accepts this alliance except Hadi who wants to marry Mishi. Roomi is found to be pregnant. Soon Faazi too finds out about Hadi and Mishi and gets angry on Hadi for breaking his trust. Baibay, Amma and Kishwar too learn about Hadi-Mishi's relationship and all of them emotionally blackmail Hadi and Mishi to not marry each other. When Faazi learns that Meenu knew about Hadi and Mishi's relationship, he gets angry and tells her to leave the house. Meenu leaves the Nawab House and comes back to Nawab Villa. An alliance has been found for Mishi and for this Faazi comes to Nawab House to take Meenu back with him, Meenu refuses to leave and Faazi gets angry, about to raise his hand on her but does not. But Mirchi goes out and tells the family that Faazi slapped Meenu. Hadi questions and fights with Faazi for misbehaving with Meenu and proclaims his love for Mishi in front of her suitors. Meenu clears the misunderstanding that Faazi didn't raise his hand on her. Mishi leaves the house without letting anyone know. Hadi tries to find Mishi everywhere after Bade Abba seals the deal that if Hadi brings Mishi back within 2 days, he will get them married but if he is unable to find her, he has to marry Bade Abba's granddaughter- Natasha. Hadi fails to find Mishi and everyone begin preparations for his wedding with Natasha. Meenu decides to seek divorce from Faazi because of him not taking a stand for their relationship in front of Gul. But now Faazi wants to save their relationship. Faaz shows the mirror to Gul and she realizes her mistakes and seeks apology from Meenu. Gul is also found to be pregnant. Hadi talks to Mishi one day before his wedding on call but she refuses to come as she thinks it's too late now and Hadi should have taken stand at the right time. Baibay and Amma unexpectedly become good friends. The wedding day arrives and everyone is happy except Hadi who is quite bitter towards his family for not understanding his feelings. The Nikah takes place ( according to him, with Natasha) but when he lifts up the bride's veil, it is revealed that Hadi has been married to Mishi. It is revealed that everything was planned and everyone ( except Hadi and Meenu ) were involved in the plan of their wedding. Meenu, who thought that Faazi is doing wrong by not accepting Hadi's and Mishi's relationship, melts after she gets to know Fazi was involved in their wedding plan. Hadi thanks Faazi and reveals that the divorce papers (khula notice) which Meenu had sent to him were fake, written by Hadi, and they were trying to test Faazi! Faazi apologies to Meenu for his behaviour and the two reconcile.

The story ends with both the couples (Faazi-Meenu & Hadi-Mishi) shown happily married.

Cast 
 Osman Khalid Butt as Faaz Ibrahim aka Faazi, the eldest and only son of Nawab House, Meenu's husband, Naik Bakht's grandson. A twin to Gul but only a minute younger and Ramisha and Rameen's elder brother. His father and mother died when they went to perform Hajj (Muslim pilgrimage). Faaz owns his grandfather's pesticides business and is fairly successful. He is constantly pressurized by the ladies of the house, especially Gul.
 Ayeza Khan as Maniha Kifayat Ali/Maniha Faaz Ibrahim aka Meenu, Kifayat and Kaneez's daughter, Faaz's wife and Naik Parwar's grand daughter. A happy-go-lucky girl, she despises studies and gets ridiculed by her family for her childish manners. She has been consistently failing in her BS Mathematics and is taught by Faaz.
 Arslan Naseer as Muhammad Hadi Kamil, the eldest son of Kishwar and love interest of Ramisha aka Mishi. Although possessing an M.B.A degree, he is unemployed and does not get accepted by the suitors. His family wants him to work at Kifayat's poultry business against his will. He falls in love with Mishi.
 Aymen Saleem as Ramisha Ibrahim aka Mishi and Ramisha Muhammad Hadi Kamil, Faaz's youngest sister and Muhammed Hadi Kamil Wife. She is the most generous and liberal of her family, but the most ignored one too. She has a crush on Hadi and In the last episode becomes Hadi Wife.
 Asma Abbas as Naik Parwar, Nawab Sahab's first wife and the matriarch of Nawab Villa. She is a native of Okara. Naik Parwar is in a never-ending clash with Bakhto.
 Uzma Beg as Naik Bakht aka Bakhto, Nawab Sahab's second wife and the matriarch of the Nawab House. A native of Sadiqabad, Nawab Sahab married her only two months after his first marriage. She never backs in her clash with Naik Parwar.
 Aadi Khan as Waleed Kamil (aka Kaddo as called by Meenu and Mirchi), Kishwar's youngest son and Hadi's brother. He is a cricket fanatic and Maniha’s partner-in-crime. He is obsessed with getting selected for Under 19 cricket team and is dating the coach's daughter, Jannat, for selection.
 Farhan Ally Agha as Kifayat Ali, Naik Parwar's younger son. He is a stingy and miser  and only cares about the expenses of the house and tries his best to save money. He owns his father's poultry business.
 Tara Mahmood as Kaneez, Kifayat's wife and Maneeha and Muneeba's mother. She is obsessed with cleaning the house and is known for her friendship with her sister-in-law, Kishwar.
 Ayesha Mirza as Kishwar Kamil, the elder daughter-in-law of Nawab Villa and widow of Kamil (elder son of Nawab and Naik Parwar). She is the mother of Hadi and Waleed and is known for always doing wazifas for her children. She has very good relations with Kaneez and other family members.
 Mira Sethi as Gul-e-Rana aka Gul/Minto, Faaz's stone-hearted twin but only a minute older. After their parents' death, Gul cares for her siblings and stayed at her home even after her marriage with Miskeen. Resultantly, she is highly possessive of them, especially Faaz.
 Ali Safina as Miskeen Ali, Gul's submissive husband and Bakhto's nephew who lives with them in the Nawab House. He is ridiculed by the family for his laziness and nosy attitude.
 Hira Soomro as Rameen Ibrahim aka Roomi. She is a foodie and always mentions her husband, Maani, in every conversation.
 Areesha Sultan as Muniba Kifayat Ali aka Mirchi, Kifayat and Kaneez's youngest daughter and Maneeha's younger sister. She manages Naik Parwar's social media accounts but uses them to spread the family's private news against their will.
Salman Saqib as Arman aka Mani, Rameen's frustrated, hot-tempered husband. He is a foodie like his wife and despises Miskeen.
 Qavi Khan as Bade Abba, Nawab Sahab's elder brother who is the only authority Naik Parwar and Bakhto listen to.
 Arisha Razi as Jannat, The coach's daughter whom Waleed is dating for selection. She keeps convincing him for their engagement.  
Sidra Niazi as Hania Amjad, the former fiancée of Faaz Ibrahim and sister of Ashar. 
Arslan Asad Butt as Ashar Amjad, the former fiancé of Muniha and brother of Hania.
Shehryar Zaidi as Mr. Amjad, Hania and Ashar's father. 
Salma Asim as Mrs. Amjad, Hania and Ashar's mother. 
Nadia Hussain as Mai Choo Mantar. She came to the Nawab House to make the house safe from evil eyes but ended up stealing their possessions.
 Sumbul Shahid as Khala

Soundtrack

The title song of Chupke Chupke "Pareshan Kyun Lage Tu" was composed by Naveed Nashad, with lyrics for song was written by Nashad and Ali Zafar. The lines of the song, sung by Zafar and Nirmal Roy, have been frequently used during the course of the show.

Production
Writer Saima Akram Chaudhry revealed in an interview that Meenu's character is inspired from the personality of Pakistani drama writer Misbah Nousheen. The production of the drama was halted in 2020 due to the ongoing COVID-19 pandemic. Because of this, some character's were recast, included Ayeza Khan replacing Sohai Ali Abro as Meenu and Asma Abbas replacing Beo Raana Zafar as Naik Parwar, which was also offered to Nadia Afgan. The first episode of the series was aired on 14 April 2021.

Reception

Audience reception 
On television broadcast, it received high ratings of 6-7 TRPs throughout its broadcast with 8.2 at its highest and was often a slot leader. It gained 100 million collective views on YouTube within two weeks.

Critical reception 
The first episode of the series received mixed reviews due to complex dynamics of the characters and their relations with each other. DAWN Images praised the performances of Asma Abbbas, Uzma Beg and their characters' dynamics. Osman Khalid Butt and Ayeza Khan's performance was also praised with Khan's performance was called as "surprise" as she usually plays damsel in distress. The on-screen chemistry of the lead couples were also lauded, especially of Arslan Naseer and Aymen Saleem which earned social media acclaim prominence to the couple. While writing for Dawn, Maliha Rehman criticised the portrayal of talaq in the series as a stigma for women. It was also criticized for the depiction of cousin marriage.

It became third most searched item on google among 'Movie & TV' in Pakistan in the year it was broadcast, as reported by the google trends at the end of the year.

Awards and nominations

References

External links
Official website

Pakistani romantic drama television series
Hum TV original programming
2021 Pakistani television series debuts
2021 Pakistani television series endings
Urdu-language television shows
Ramadan special television shows